Wakefield is a city in West Yorkshire, England.

Wakefield may also refer to:

Places

England
 City of Wakefield, a metropolitan borough of West Yorkshire, England
 Wakefield Prison, located in this city
 Wakefield (UK Parliament constituency), located in this city
 Wakefield Trinity, rugby league club located in city
 Diocese of Wakefield, former Church of England diocese based in the city

Australia
 Wakefield, New South Wales
 Wakefield Street, Adelaide, in Adelaide, South Australia
 Wakefield Regional Council, a local government area in South Australia
 Division of Wakefield, an Australian electoral division

United States
 Wakefield, Alabama
 Wakefield, Illinois
 Wakefield, Indiana
 Wakefield, Kansas
 Wakefield, Kentucky
 Wakefield, Louisiana
 Wakefield, Massachusetts
 Wakefield Historic District, listed on the NRHP
 Wakefield (MBTA station)
 Wakefield, Michigan
 Wakefield (Holly Springs, Mississippi), a historic mansion
 Wakefield, Nebraska
 Wakefield, New Hampshire
 Wakefield, Bronx, New York
 Wakefield, North Carolina
 Wakefield, Ohio
 Wakefield, Pennsylvania
 Wakefield, Rhode Island
 Wakefield, Virginia
 Wakefield, Fairfax County, Virginia
 Wakefield (Washington, D.C.), a neighborhood
 Wakefield, Wisconsin, a ghost town
 Wakefield Township, Michigan
 Wakefield Township, Minnesota
 Wakefield Township, Dixon County, Nebraska

Elsewhere
 Wakefield Parish, New Brunswick, Canada
 Wakefield, New Brunswick, an unincorporated community in Wakefield Parish
 Wakefield, Quebec, Canada
 Wakefield, Jamaica
 Wakefield, New Zealand

Arts and entertainment
 Wakefield (band), an American rock band
 Wakefield (film), a 2016 American drama film
 Wakefield (TV series), a 2021 Australian television series
 "Wakefield", an 1837 short story published in Nathaniel Hawthorne's Twice-Told Tales
 "Wakefield", a 2008 short story by E. L. Doctorow
 Wakefield Cycle, a manuscript containing thirty-two Medieval religious plays

Other uses
 Battle of Wakefield, in the Wars of the Roses, 1460
 Calvary Wakefield Hospital, formerly Wakefield Hospital and known informally as "the Wakefield", Adelaide, South Australia
 Wakefield (surname)
 Wakefield station (disambiguation)
 Wakefield High School (disambiguation)
 Wakefield Hall, an office building in the United States
 Wakefield Press (Australia), a South Australian publishing company
 USS Wakefield (AP-21) a United States Navy troop transport ship during World War II
 Wakefield, a term for the area following a laser pulse in plasma acceleration

See also
 The Vicar of Wakefield, a novel by Oliver Goldsmith
 Cushman & Wakefield, a commercial real estate company headquartered in New York City
 Heywood-Wakefield Company, U.S. furniture manufacturer
 Port Wakefield (disambiguation)